Horace Clark was an American politician from New York.

Life
He was an Anti-Masonic member of the New York State Assembly (Erie Co.) in 1832 and 1833.

Sources
The New York Civil List compiled by Franklin Benjamin Hough (pages 212f and 265; Weed, Parsons and Co., 1858)

People from Erie County, New York
Members of the New York State Assembly
Anti-Masonic Party politicians from New York (state)
19th-century American politicians